Valentina Delion (born October 30, 1973) is a Moldovan marathon runner. She set a personal best time of 2:36:50, by winning the 2005 Bonn Marathon in Germany.

At age thirty-four, Delion made her official debut for the 2008 Summer Olympics in Beijing, where she competed in the women's marathon. She did not finish the race, before reaching the 35 km lap of the course.

References

External links

NBC 2008 Olympics profile

Moldovan female marathon runners
Living people
Olympic athletes of Moldova
Athletes (track and field) at the 2008 Summer Olympics
1973 births
21st-century Moldovan women